William Corcoran Phillips (November 9, 1868 – October 25, 1941), nicknamed "Whoa Bill" or "Silver Bill", was an American right-handed pitcher and manager in Major League Baseball.

Phillips was born in Allenport, Pennsylvania. At the age of 21, Phillips broke into the big leagues on August 11, 1890, playing his first 10 games for the Pittsburgh Alleghenys. As a player, he pitched for seven seasons in the majors. In 1895 he came back to play 18 more games for the Cincinnati Reds. In 1899 he went 17–9 on a team that featured 19-year-old rookie Sam Crawford and manager Buck Ewing. Phillips played for the Reds from 1899 to 1903, playing his last game on September 22. In a game against the Reds in 1900, Phillips punched Roy Thomas after Thomas fouled off twelve pitches in a single at-bat in the eighth inning.

Phillips managed the 1914 Indianapolis Hoosiers to the Federal League pennant. His top hitter was Benny Kauff and the top pitcher was Cy Falkenberg. Later he and Bill McKechnie managed the Newark Pepper, finishing the 1915 season fifth in the Federal League.

He died at age 72 in Charleroi, Pennsylvania, and was buried in Mount Auburn Cemetery in Fayette City, Pennsylvania.

References

External links

Baseball-Reference.com – career playing statistics and managerial record
Baseball Almanac
 

1868 births
1941 deaths
Major League Baseball pitchers
Cincinnati Reds players
Pittsburgh Alleghenys players
Baseball players from Pennsylvania
Indianapolis Hoosiers managers
Washington Senators (minor league) players
Chattanooga Chatts players
Akron Summits players
Johnstown Terrors players
Memphis Fever Germs players
Nashville Tigers players
Indianapolis Hoosiers (minor league) players
Indianapolis Indians managers
Indianapolis Indians players
New Orleans Pelicans (baseball) players
Mobile Sea Gulls players
Columbus Discoverers players
East Liverpool Potters (baseball) players
Wheeling Stogies players
19th-century baseball players
People from Washington County, Pennsylvania